"Sooner or Later" is a song recorded by American country music group The Forester Sisters on their 1987 album You Again. In 1989, the song was recorded by country artist Eddy Raven and released in December 1989 as the third single from his album Temporary Sanity.  The song reached #6 on the Billboard Hot Country Singles & Tracks chart.  The song was written by Susan Longacre, Bill LaBounty and Beckie Foster.

Content
The song is composed in the key of D major. Its verses follow the pattern G-A-G-D twice, followed by E7-G-A. The chorus follows the pattern D-Bm-G-A twice before ending on a D7 chord.

Critical reception
An uncredited review in Billboard described it as a "pounding, rollicking number" that "should propel him back to those same chart heights."

Chart performance

Year-end charts

References

1990 singles
The Forester Sisters songs
Eddy Raven songs
Songs written by Bill LaBounty
Song recordings produced by Barry Beckett
Capitol Records Nashville singles
Songs written by Susan Longacre
1987 songs
Songs written by Beckie Foster